Ras Menheli is a point in Yemen on the coast of Bab-el-Mandeb close to the island of Perim.

References

Landforms of Yemen
Headlands of Asia